My Life: The True Testimony is the debut solo studio album by American rapper Blood Raw. It was released on June 17, 2008 via Corporate Thugz Entertainment/Def Jam Recordings. Recording sessions took place at Dirty South Studios, Thug Mansion Studios and PatchWerk Recording Studios in Atlanta, and at 360 Studios in Tallahassee. Production was handled by Arnaz 'The Nazty One' Smith, Midnight Black, Cliff Brown, Drumma Boy, J.U.S.T.I.C.E. League, Mannie Fresh, Megaman, PnO, Terry "T.A." Allen, The Runners, Tony Rey, with Demetrius "Kinky B" Ellerbee and Young Jeezy serving as executive producers. It features guest appearances from Big Rube, Lyfe Jennings, Mannie Fresh, Torica, Trina, and fellow U.S.D.A. groupmates Slick Pulla and Young Jeezy. The album was preceded by its lead single "Louie".

The album debuted at number 29 on the US Billboard 200, selling 17,377 copies in its first week.

Track listing

Personnel 

Bruce "Blood Raw" Falson – main artist
Ruben "Big Rube" Bailey – featured artist (track 1)
Jay "Young Jeezy" Jenkins – featured artist (track 3), executive producer
Byron "Mannie Fresh" Thomas – featured artist & producer (track 4)
Katrina "Trina" Taylor – featured artist (track 5)
Renaldo "Slick Pulla" Whitman – featured artist (track 6)
Chester "Lyfe" Jennings – featured artist (track 7)
Porsha – additional vocals (track 9)
Torica Cornelius – voice (track 10)
Delarmon "P-No" Harold – producer (track 1)
Christopher "Drumma Boy" Gholson – producer (track 2)
Tracey "Midnight Black" Sewell – producer (tracks: 3, 11)
Peter Arnaz 'The Nazty One' Smith – producer (tracks: 5, 8)
Cliff Brown – producer (track 6)
Tony Rey – producer (track 6), recording (tracks: 1, 3-8, 11-13), mixing (tracks: 1-9, 11-12)
Terry "T.A." Allen – producer (track 7)
Erik "Rook" Ortiz – producer (track 9)
Kevin "Colione" Crowe – producer (track 9)
Orville "Mega Man" McWhinney – producer (track 12)
Andrew "Dru Brett" Harr – producer (track 13)
Jermaine "Mayne Zayne" Jackson – producer (track 13)
Larry Pardillo – recording (tracks: 2, 13), mixing (track 13)
G-Fat – recording (track 9)
Chris Athens – mastering
Demetrius "Kinky B" Ellerbee – executive producer, A&R
Scott Danskin – art direction, design
Tavon Sampson – art direction, design
Clay Patrick McBride – photography
Kristen Yiengst – art & photography coordinator
Erica Bowen – A&R
Lindsay Rodman – A&R
Leesa D. Brunson – A&R
Shakir Stewart – A&R

Chart history

References

External links 

2008 debut albums
Def Jam Recordings albums
Albums produced by Drumma Boy
Albums produced by the Runners
Albums produced by Mannie Fresh
Albums produced by J.U.S.T.I.C.E. League